Braden Jack Shewmake (born November 19, 1997) is an American professional baseball shortstop for the Atlanta Braves of Major League Baseball (MLB).  He was selected by the Braves with the 21st overall pick in the 2019 Major League Baseball draft.

Amateur career
Shewmake attended and graduated from Wylie East High School in Wylie, Texas, where he played baseball, football, and basketball. As a senior, he hit .295 with 28 RBIs and was named to the Texas 5A All-State Baseball Team. Undrafted out of high school in the 2016 Major League Baseball draft, he enrolled at Texas A&M University to play college baseball for the Texas A&M Aggies.

In 2017, as a freshman, Shewmake batted .328 with 11 home runs and 69 RBIs in 64 starts. He was named the SEC Freshman of the Year along with being named Collegiate Baseball's Freshman of the Year. Furthermore, he was named an All-American by multiple media outlets including Collegiate Baseball and Baseball America. Shewmake spent that summer playing for the USA Baseball Collegiate National Team. As a sophomore in 2018, Shewmake started all 61 games in which he hit .327 with five home runs, 45 RBIs, and 12 stolen bases. He was named to the All-SEC First Team for the second straight year. That summer, he returned to play for the USA Baseball Collegiate National Team. In 2019, his junior season, he batted primarily in the leadoff spot. He played in 63 games and batted .313 with six home runs, 47 RBIs, and nine stolen bases.

Professional career
Shewmake was considered one of the top prospects for the 2019 Major League Baseball draft. He was selected by the Atlanta Braves with the 21st overall pick. He signed for $3.13 million, and was assigned to the Rome Braves of the Class A South Atlantic League. After slashing .318/.389/.473 with three home runs, 39 RBIs, and 11 stolen bases over 51 games with Rome, he was promoted to the Mississippi Braves of the Class AA Southern League in August, and finished the season there. Over 14 games with Mississippi, Shewmake hit .217.

Shewmake did not play a minor league game in 2020 due to the cancellation of the minor league season caused by the COVID-19 pandemic. For the 2021 season, he returned to Mississippi (now members of the Double-A South), slashing .228/.271/.401 with 12 home runs and forty RBIs over 83 games. Shewmake was assigned to the Gwinnett Stripers of the Triple-A International League to begin the 2022 season. In early August, he was placed on the injured list with a left leg injury after being carted off of the field following a collision with left fielder Travis Demeritte, and he missed the remainder of the season. Over 76 games prior to the injury, he slashed .259/.316/.399 with seven home runs and 25 RBIs.

On November 15, 2022, the Braves selected Shewmake's contract and added him to the 40-man roster.

References

External links

Texas A&M Aggies bio

1997 births
Living people
People from Wylie, Texas
Baseball players from Texas
Baseball shortstops
United States national baseball team players
Texas A&M Aggies baseball players
Rome Braves players
Mississippi Braves players